Han Liming (born September 1964) is a Chinese politician who has been communist party secretary of Nanjing, the top political position in the city, since June 2021.

She was a delegate to the 11th National People's Congress and is a delegate to the 13th National People's Congress.

Early life and education
Han was born in Changzhou, Jiangsu, in September 1964. She graduated from Zhenjiang Normal School as well as Zhenjiang Shipbuilding College. She began graduate work at Southeast University in 1997 and the Party School of CPC Jiangsu Provincial Committee in 2001.

Career
Han entered the workforce in August 1984, and joined the Communist Party of China (CPC) in April 1986. She was promoted to be deputy communist party secretary of Zhonglou District in April 2002, and soon assigned to the similar position in Wujin District in December of that same year. She concurrently held the vice governor position there. She became deputy communist party secretary and mayor of Liyang, a county-level city under the jurisdiction of Changzhou, in December 2005, and then communist party secretary, the top political position in the city, and also chairperson of Liyang Municipal People's Congress, beginning in January 2009. 

She was appointed head of the Organization Department of CPC Nantong Municipal Committee in May 2011, concurrently serving as a member of the standing committee of the CPC Nantong Municipal Committee, the city's top authority. She served as executive vice mayor of Nantong in June 2012, and promoted to the mayor position in January 2016. 

She was promoted to be communist party secretary of Taizhou, a neighboring city of Nantong, in April 2018, concurrently holding the chairperson of Taizhou Municipal People's Congress position since January 2019.

In September 2019, she was transferred to Nanjing, capital of Jiangsu province, and appointed deputy communist party secretary and director of Management Committee of Jiangbei New Area. She served as mayor from October 2019 to April 2021, and communist party secretary, the top political position in the city, beginning in June 2021. In April 2021, she was promoted to member of the standing committee of the CPC Jiangsu Provincial Committee, the province's top authority.

References

1964 births
Living people
Politicians from Nantong
Southeast University alumni
People's Republic of China politicians from Jiangsu
Chinese Communist Party politicians from Jiangsu
Delegates to the 11th National People's Congress
Delegates to the 13th National People's Congress